A document file format is a text or binary file format for storing documents on a storage media, especially for use by computers.
There currently exist a multitude of incompatible document file formats.

Examples of XML-based open standards are DocBook, XHTML, and, more recently, the ISO/IEC standards OpenDocument (ISO 26300:2006) and Office Open XML (ISO 29500:2008).

In 1993, the ITU-T tried to establish a standard for document file formats, known as the Open Document Architecture (ODA) which was supposed to replace all competing document file formats. It is described in ITU-T documents T.411 through T.421, which are equivalent to ISO 8613. It did not succeed.

Page description languages such as PostScript and PDF have become the de facto standard for documents that a typical user should only be able to create and read, not edit. In 2001, a series of ISO/IEC standards for PDF began to be published, including the specification for PDF itself, ISO-32000.

HTML is the most used and open international standard and it is also used as document file format. It has also become ISO/IEC standard (ISO 15445:2000).

The default binary file format used by Microsoft Word (.doc) has become widespread de facto standard for office documents, but it is a proprietary format and is not always fully supported by other word processors.

Common document file formats
 ASCII, UTF-8 — plain text formats
 Amigaguide
 .doc for Microsoft Word — Structural binary format developed by Microsoft (specifications available since 2008 under the Open Specification Promise)
 DjVu — file format designed primarily to store scanned documents
 DocBook — an XML format for technical documentation
 HTML (.html, .htm), (open standard, ISO from 2000), in combination with possible image files referred to.
 FictionBook (.fb2) — open XML-based e-book format
 Markdown (.md) — markup language for creating formatted text using plain text
 Office Open XML — .docx (XML-based standard for office documents)
 OpenDocument — .odt (XML-based standard for office documents)
 OpenOffice.org XML — .sxw (open, XML-based format for office documents)
 OXPS — Open XML Paper Specification (Windows 8.1 and above, older version is XPS used in Windows 7)
 PalmDoc — handheld document format
 .pages for Pages
 PDF — Open standard for document exchange. ISO standards include PDF/X (eXchange), PDF/A (Archive), PDF/E (Engineering), ISO 32000 (PDF), PDF/UA (Accessibility) and PDF/VT (Variable data and transactional printing). PDF is readable on almost every platform with free or open source readers. Open source PDF creators are also available.
 PostScript —  .ps
 Rich Text Format (RTF) — meta data format being developed by Microsoft since 1987 for Microsoft products and cross-platform document interchange
 SYmbolic LinK (SYLK)
 Scalable Vector Graphics (SVG) - Graphics format primarily for vector-based images.
 TeX — Open-source typesetting program and format. First successful mathematical notation language.
 TEI — XML format for digital publication
 Troff
 Uniform Office Format — Chinese standard
 WordPerfect (.wpd, .wp, .wp7, .doc) (Note: possible confusion with Word format extension)

See also
List of document file formats
List of document markup languages
Comparison of document markup languages
Open format 
Word Processor
 Desktop Publishing
 LaTeX

References

External links
Lost in Translation: Interoperability Issues for Open Standards - ODF and OOXML as Examples

Computer file formats